The Pinconning River (Ojibwe Opinikaaning-ziibi (syncope as Pinkaaning-ziibi), "River at potatoing-grounds") is a small river on the central Lower Peninsula of Michigan in the United States. Via Lake Huron and the Great Lakes system, it is part of the larger watershed of the St. Lawrence River.

The Pinconning River's course and watershed are entirely in northern Bay County.

The Saginaw Bay Land Conservancy owns a nature preserve, the Pinconning Nature Preserve, along the river in Pinconning Township. Bay County operates a county park, Pinconning Park, on the north bank of the river at its mouth.

Tributaries
This is a list of named streams in the Pinconning River's watershed, as identified by the National Hydrography Dataset. All are direct tributaries of the Pinconning River.  By default, the list is ordered from the mouth of the river to its source.

See also
List of rivers of Michigan

References 

Rivers of Michigan
Rivers of Bay County, Michigan
Tributaries of Lake Huron
Saginaw Bay